Lucas Alcázar Moreno (born 11 July 2002) is a Spanish professional footballer who plays as a left-back for Real Madrid Castilla.

Career statistics

Club

Honours 

 Real Madrid Juvenil A

 UEFA Youth League: 2019–20

References

External links 
 Real Madrid profile
 
 
 

2002 births
Living people
Footballers from the Community of Madrid
Spanish footballers
Association football defenders
SCR Peña Deportiva players
Real Madrid Castilla footballers
Segunda Federación players